Mina & Gaber: un'ora con loro is an album by Italian singer Mina at A side and Italian artist Giorgio Gaber at B side. 

It was the first time that the songs "Ora o mai più" and "Brava" - previously released on 45rpm records - were included in an album.

Track listing

Side A - Mina

Side B - Giorgio Gaber

1965 compilation albums
Italian-language albums
Mina (Italian singer) compilation albums
Giorgio Gaber albums
Split albums